Trouville is the name or part of the name of several communes of Normandy, France:

 Trouville, Seine-Maritime, in the Seine-Maritime department
 Trouville-sur-Mer, in the Calvados department, arguably the most famous of these communes, and commonly referred to as Trouville
 Trouville-la-Haule, in the Eure department

Other uses
 Plaza Trouville, a town square in the Pocitos neighbourhood of Montevideo, Uruguay
 Club Trouville, a sports club based in Montevideo